Pasjane or Pasjani, is a village in the municipality of Parteš in Kosovo. It is inhabited by a majority of ethnic Serbs.

History
The village was mentioned as Pasjan in the Ottoman defter of 1455 of the Vlk Vilayet (Vilayet of Vuk), encompassing most of Vuk Branković's former territory. At that time the village was populated exclusively by Serbs, on the forehead with priest, living in 94 households.

In 1907, there was a battle between Serbian Chetnik Organization and Ottoman Empire In the villages church.

In the 19th-20th ceuntry, Bosiljka Rajčić lived in the village of Pasjane, she was proclaimed Saint on 3rd of May 2018 by the Serbian Orthodox Church.

Notes

References

Villages in Parteš
Serbian enclaves in Kosovo